Fight Island is a series of Ultimate Fighting Championship (UFC) mixed martial arts events held on Yas Island in Abu Dhabi, United Arab Emirates in 2020 and 2021 during the COVID-19 pandemic.

Dana White stated that the events were intended as a workaround for travel restrictions tied to the COVID-19 pandemic, which had been preventing some international fighters from entering the United States. White initially referred to the proposed site as a "private island" or "fight island".

Until 2021, all Fight Island events were held behind closed doors in the du Forum; a bio-secure bubble was established, which consisted of a "safe zone" comprising hotels, training facilities, the beach, and restaurants. All participants and staff were required to test negative for SARS-CoV-2 multiple times before traveling to or entering the bubble, and individuals entering the arena were required to go through disinfecting "mist tunnels". As the events were closed to the public, they were scheduled for U.S. primetime hours rather than local time, with UFC 251's preliminaries beginning at 2:00 a.m. Gulf Standard Time.

John Oliver suggested on Last Week Tonight that the name "Fight Island" was inspired by a suggestion made by a TMZ reporter one week before the trademark was filed. Shortly after Oliver had suggested various alternative names for the island including "UF-Sea", Zuffa registered "UFSEA" as a trademark.

Beginning with UFC on ABC: Holloway vs. Kattar on January 16, 2021, the UFC moved its Fight Island events to Yas Island's newly-opened Etihad Arena, capped at 2,000 of its 18,000-seat capacity. They were the first UFC events open to the public since the onset of the pandemic.

Events

See also 

 2020 in UFC
 2021 in UFC
 Impact of the COVID-19 pandemic on sports

References 
 

Ultimate Fighting Championship
Sports venues in Abu Dhabi